Roberto Aude Jabali (born 16 May 1970) is a former professional tennis player from Brazil.

Career
Jabali was a semi-finalist in the boys' singles event at the 1988 French Open and also made the final of the Banana Bowl that year.

He runner-up in the 1994 Mexican Open, as a qualifier, losing the final to reigning champion Thomas Muster. The Brazilian defeated world number 32 and second seed Mikael Pernfors at the 1994 U.S. Men's Clay Court Championships.

In the 1996 US Open, Jabali lost his final qualifying match to Australian Peter Tramacchi, but entered the main draw as a lucky loser. He lost in straight sets to Tim Henman in the opening round. It would be his only Grand Slam appearance.

ATP Tour career finals

Singles: 1 (0–1)

Challenger titles

Singles: (5)

References

1970 births
Living people
Brazilian male tennis players
People from Ribeirão Preto
Sportspeople from São Paulo (state)
20th-century Brazilian people
21st-century Brazilian people